In the theory of general relativity, the equivalence principle is the equivalence of gravitational and inertial mass, and Albert Einstein's observation that the gravitational "force" as experienced locally while standing on a massive body (such as the Earth) is the same as the pseudo-force experienced by an observer in a non-inertial (accelerated) frame of reference.

Einstein's statement of the equality of inertial and gravitational mass

Development of gravitational theory 

Something like the equivalence principle emerged in the early 17th century, when Galileo expressed experimentally that the acceleration of a test mass due to gravitation is independent of the amount of mass being accelerated.

Johannes Kepler, using Galileo's discoveries, showed knowledge of the equivalence principle by accurately describing what would occur if the Moon were stopped in its orbit and dropped towards Earth. This can be deduced without knowing if or in what manner gravity decreases with distance, but requires assuming the equivalency between gravity and inertia.

The 1/54 ratio is Kepler's estimate of the Moon–Earth mass ratio, based on their diameters. The accuracy of his statement can be deduced by using Newton's inertia law F=ma and Galileo's gravitational observation that distance .  Setting these accelerations equal for a mass is the equivalence principle. Noting the time to collision for each mass is the same gives Kepler's statement that Dmoon/DEarth=MEarth/Mmoon, without knowing the time to collision or how or if the acceleration force from gravity is a function of distance.

Newton's gravitational theory simplified and formalized Galileo's and Kepler's ideas by recognizing Kepler's "animal force or some other equivalent" beyond gravity and inertia were not needed, deducing from Kepler's planetary laws how gravity reduces with distance.

The equivalence principle was properly introduced by Albert Einstein in 1907, when he observed that the acceleration of bodies towards the center of the Earth at a rate of 1g (g = 9.81 m/s2 being a standard reference of gravitational acceleration at the Earth's surface) is equivalent to the acceleration of an inertially moving body that would be observed on a rocket in free space being accelerated at a rate of 1g. Einstein stated it thus:

That is, being on the surface of the Earth is equivalent to being inside a spaceship (far from any sources of gravity) that is being accelerated by its engines. The direction or vector of acceleration equivalence on the surface of the earth is "up" or directly opposite the center of the planet while the vector of acceleration in a spaceship is directly opposite from the mass ejected by its thrusters. From this principle, Einstein deduced that free-fall is inertial motion. Objects in free-fall do not experience being accelerated downward (e.g. toward the earth or other massive body) but rather weightlessness and no acceleration. In an inertial frame of reference bodies (and photons, or light) obey Newton's first law, moving at constant velocity in straight lines. Analogously, in a curved spacetime the world line of an inertial particle or pulse of light is as straight as possible (in space and time). Such a world line is called a geodesic and from the point of view of the inertial frame is a straight line. This is why an accelerometer in free-fall doesn't register any acceleration; there isn't any between the internal test mass and the accelerometer's body.

As an example: an inertial body moving along a geodesic through space can be trapped into an orbit around a large gravitational mass without ever experiencing acceleration. This is possible because spacetime is radically curved in close vicinity to a large gravitational mass. In such a situation the geodesic lines bend inward around the center of the mass and a free-floating (weightless) inertial body will simply follow those curved geodesics into an elliptical orbit. An accelerometer on-board would never record any acceleration.

By contrast, in Newtonian mechanics, gravity is assumed to be a force. This force draws objects having mass towards the center of any massive body. At the Earth's surface, the force of gravity is counteracted by the mechanical (physical) resistance of the Earth's surface. So in Newtonian physics, a person at rest on the surface of a (non-rotating) massive object is in an inertial frame of reference. These considerations suggest the following corollary to the equivalence principle, which Einstein formulated precisely in 1911:

Einstein also referred to two reference frames, K and K'. K is a uniform gravitational field, whereas K' has no gravitational field but is uniformly accelerated such that objects in the two frames experience identical forces:

This observation was the start of a process that culminated in general relativity. Einstein suggested that it should be elevated to the status of a general principle, which he called the "principle of equivalence" when constructing his theory of relativity:

Einstein combined (postulated) the equivalence principle with special relativity to predict that clocks run at different rates in a gravitational potential, and light rays bend in a gravitational field, even before he developed the concept of curved spacetime.

So the original equivalence principle, as described by Einstein, concluded that free-fall and inertial motion were physically equivalent. This form of the equivalence principle can be stated as follows. An observer in a windowless room cannot distinguish between being on the surface of the Earth, and being in a spaceship in deep space accelerating at 1g. This is not strictly true, because massive bodies give rise to tidal effects (caused by variations in the strength and direction of the gravitational field) which are absent from an accelerating spaceship in deep space. The room, therefore, should be small enough that tidal effects can be neglected.

Although the equivalence principle guided the development of general relativity, it is not a founding principle of relativity but rather a simple consequence of the geometrical nature of the theory. In general relativity, objects in free-fall follow geodesics of spacetime, and what we perceive as the force of gravity is instead a result of our being unable to follow those geodesics of spacetime, because the mechanical resistance of Earth's matter or surface prevents us from doing so.

Since Einstein developed general relativity, there was a need to develop a framework to test the theory against other possible theories of gravity compatible with special relativity. This was developed by Robert Dicke as part of his program to test general relativity. Two new principles were suggested, the so-called Einstein equivalence principle and the strong equivalence principle, each of which assumes the weak equivalence principle as a starting point. They only differ in whether or not they apply to gravitational experiments.

Another clarification needed is that the equivalence principle assumes a constant acceleration of 1g without considering the mechanics of generating 1g. If we do consider the mechanics of it, then we must assume the aforementioned windowless room has a fixed mass. Accelerating it at 1g means there is a constant force being applied, which = m*g where m is the mass of the windowless room along with its contents (including the observer). Now, if the observer jumps inside the room, an object lying freely on the floor will decrease in weight momentarily because the acceleration is going to decrease momentarily due to the observer pushing back against the floor in order to jump. The object will then gain weight while the observer is in the air and the resulting decreased mass of the windowless room allows greater acceleration; it will lose weight again when the observer lands and pushes once more against the floor; and it will finally return to its initial weight afterwards. To make all these effects equal those we would measure on a planet producing 1g, the windowless room must be assumed to have the same mass as that planet. Additionally, the windowless room must not cause its own gravity, otherwise the scenario changes even further. These are technicalities, clearly, but practical ones if we wish the experiment to demonstrate more or less precisely the equivalence of 1g gravity and 1g acceleration.

Modern usage
Three forms of the equivalence principle are in current use: weak (Galilean), Einsteinian, and strong.

The weak equivalence principle
The weak equivalence principle, also known as the universality of free fall or the Galilean equivalence principle can be stated in many ways.  The strong EP, a generalization of the weak EP, includes astronomic bodies with gravitational self-binding energy (e.g., 1.74 solar-mass pulsar PSR J1903+0327, 15.3% of whose separated mass is absent as gravitational binding energy)  Instead, the weak EP assumes falling bodies are self-bound by non-gravitational forces only (e.g. a stone). Either way:

The trajectory of a point mass in a gravitational field depends only on its initial position and velocity, and is independent of its composition and structure.
All test particles at the alike spacetime point, in a given gravitational field, will undergo the same acceleration, independent of their properties, including their rest mass.
All local centers of mass free-fall (in vacuum) along identical (parallel-displaced, same speed) minimum action trajectories independent of all observable properties.
The vacuum world-line of a body immersed in a gravitational field is independent of all observable properties.
The local effects of motion in a curved spacetime (gravitation) are indistinguishable from those of an accelerated observer in flat spacetime, without exception.
Mass (measured with a balance) and weight (measured with a scale) are locally in identical ratio for all bodies (the opening page to Newton's Philosophiæ Naturalis Principia Mathematica, 1687).

Locality eliminates measurable tidal forces originating from a radial divergent gravitational field (e.g., the Earth) upon finite sized physical bodies.  The "falling" equivalence principle embraces Galileo's, Newton's, and Einstein's conceptualization.  The equivalence principle does not deny the existence of measurable effects caused by a rotating gravitating mass (frame dragging), or bear on the measurements of light deflection and gravitational time delay made by non-local observers.

Active, passive, and inertial masses 

Likewise the force on a second object of arbitrary mass2 due to the gravitational field of mass0 is:

By definition of inertial mass:

Hence:

Therefore:

In other words, passive gravitational mass must be proportional to inertial mass for all objects.

Furthermore, by Newton's third law of motion:

must be equal and opposite to

It follows that:

In other words, passive gravitational mass must be proportional to active gravitational mass for all objects.

The dimensionless Eötvös-parameter  is the difference of the ratios of gravitational and inertial masses divided by their average for the two sets of test masses "A" and "B".

Tests of the weak equivalence principle

Tests of the weak equivalence principle are those that verify the equivalence of gravitational mass and inertial mass. An obvious test is dropping different objects, ideally in a vacuum environment, e.g., inside the Fallturm Bremen drop tower.

See:

Experiments are still being performed at the University of Washington which have placed limits on the differential acceleration of objects towards the Earth, the Sun and towards dark matter in the Galactic Center. Future satellite experiments – STEP (Satellite Test of the Equivalence Principle), and Galileo Galilei – will test the weak equivalence principle in space, to much higher accuracy.

With the first successful production of antimatter, in particular anti-hydrogen, a new approach to test the weak equivalence principle has been proposed. Experiments to compare the gravitational behavior of matter and antimatter are currently being developed.

Proposals that may lead to a quantum theory of gravity such as string theory and loop quantum gravity predict violations of the weak equivalence principle because they contain many light scalar fields with long Compton wavelengths, which should generate fifth forces and variation of the fundamental constants. Heuristic arguments suggest that the magnitude of these equivalence principle violations could be in the 10−13 to 10−18 range. Currently envisioned tests of the weak equivalence principle are approaching a degree of sensitivity such that non-discovery of a violation would be just as profound a result as discovery of a violation. Non-discovery of equivalence principle violation in this range would suggest that gravity is so fundamentally different from other forces as to require a major reevaluation of current attempts to unify gravity with the other forces of nature. A positive detection, on the other hand, would provide a major guidepost towards unification.

The Einstein equivalence principle

What is now called the "Einstein equivalence principle" states that the weak equivalence principle holds, and that:

Here "local" has a very special meaning: not only must the experiment not look outside the laboratory, but it must also be small compared to variations in the gravitational field, tidal forces, so that the entire laboratory is freely falling. It also implies the absence of interactions with "external" fields other than the gravitational field.

The principle of relativity implies that the outcome of local experiments must be independent of the velocity of the apparatus, so the most important consequence of this principle is the Copernican idea that dimensionless physical values such as the fine-structure constant and electron-to-proton mass ratio must not depend on where in space or time we measure them.  Many physicists believe that any Lorentz invariant theory that satisfies the weak equivalence principle also satisfies the Einstein equivalence principle.

Schiff's conjecture suggests that the weak equivalence principle implies the Einstein equivalence principle, but it has not been proven. Nonetheless, the two principles are tested with very different kinds of experiments. The Einstein equivalence principle has been criticized as imprecise, because there is no universally accepted way to distinguish gravitational from non-gravitational experiments (see for instance Hadley and Durand).

Tests of the Einstein equivalence principle
In addition to the tests of the weak equivalence principle, the Einstein equivalence principle can be tested by searching for variation of dimensionless constants and mass ratios. The present best limits on the variation of the fundamental constants have mainly been set by studying the naturally occurring Oklo natural nuclear fission reactor, where nuclear reactions similar to ones we observe today have been shown to have occurred underground approximately two billion years ago. These reactions are extremely sensitive to the values of the fundamental constants.

There have been a number of controversial attempts to constrain the variation of the strong interaction constant. There have been several suggestions that "constants" do vary on cosmological scales. The best known is the reported detection of variation (at the 10−5 level) of the fine-structure constant from measurements of distant quasars, see Webb et al. Other researchers dispute these findings. Other tests of the Einstein equivalence principle are gravitational redshift experiments, such as the Pound–Rebka experiment which test the position independence of experiments.

The strong equivalence principle
The strong equivalence principle suggests the laws of gravitation are independent of velocity and location. In particular,

and

The first part is a version of the weak equivalence principle that applies to objects that exert a gravitational force on themselves, such as stars, planets, black holes or Cavendish experiments. The second part is the Einstein equivalence principle (with the same definition of "local"), restated to allow gravitational experiments and self-gravitating bodies. The freely-falling object or laboratory, however, must still be small, so that tidal forces may be neglected (hence "local experiment").

This is the only form of the equivalence principle that applies to self-gravitating objects (such as stars), which have substantial internal gravitational interactions. It requires that the gravitational constant be the same everywhere in the universe and is incompatible with a fifth force. It is much more restrictive than the Einstein equivalence principle.

The strong equivalence principle suggests that gravity is entirely geometrical by nature (that is, the metric alone determines the effect of gravity) and does not have any extra fields associated with it. If an observer measures a patch of space to be flat, then the strong equivalence principle suggests that it is absolutely equivalent to any other patch of flat space elsewhere in the universe. Einstein's theory of general relativity (including the cosmological constant) is thought to be the only theory of gravity that satisfies the strong equivalence principle. A number of alternative theories, such as Brans–Dicke theory, satisfy only the Einstein equivalence principle.

Tests of the strong equivalence principle
The strong equivalence principle can be tested by searching for a variation of Newton's gravitational constant G over the life of the universe, or equivalently, variation in the masses of the fundamental particles. A number of independent constraints, from orbits in the Solar System and studies of Big Bang nucleosynthesis have shown that G cannot have varied by more than 10%.

Thus, the strong equivalence principle can be tested by searching for fifth forces (deviations from the gravitational force-law predicted by general relativity). These experiments typically look for failures of the inverse-square law (specifically Yukawa forces or failures of Birkhoff's theorem) behavior of gravity in the laboratory. The most accurate tests over short distances have been performed by the Eöt–Wash group. A future satellite experiment, SEE (Satellite Energy Exchange), will search for fifth forces in space and should be able to further constrain violations of the strong equivalence principle. Other limits, looking for much longer-range forces, have been placed by searching for the Nordtvedt effect, a "polarization" of solar system orbits that would be caused by gravitational self-energy accelerating at a different rate from normal matter. This effect has been sensitively tested by the Lunar Laser Ranging Experiment. Other tests include studying the deflection of radiation from distant radio sources by the sun, which can be accurately measured by very long baseline interferometry. Another sensitive test comes from measurements of the frequency shift of signals to and from the Cassini spacecraft. Together, these measurements have put tight limits on Brans–Dicke theory and other alternative theories of gravity.

In 2014, astronomers discovered a stellar triple system containing a millisecond pulsar PSR J0337+1715 and two white dwarfs orbiting it. The system provided them a chance to test the strong equivalence principle in a strong gravitational field with high accuracy.

In 2020 a group of astronomers analyzed data from the Spitzer Photometry and Accurate Rotation Curves (SPARC) sample, together with estimates of the large-scale external gravitational field from an all-sky galaxy catalog. They concluded that there was highly statistically significant evidence of violations of the strong equivalence principle in weak gravitational fields in the vicinity of rotationally supported galaxies. They observed an effect consistent with the external field effect of Modified Newtonian dynamics (MOND), a hypothesis that proposes a modified gravity theory beyond general relativity, and inconsistent with tidal effects in the Lambda-CDM model paradigm, commonly known as the Standard Model of Cosmology.

Challenges
One challenge to the equivalence principle is the Brans–Dicke theory. Self-creation cosmology is a modification of the Brans–Dicke theory.

In August 2010, researchers from the University of New South Wales, Swinburne University of Technology, and Cambridge University published a paper titled "Evidence for spatial variation of the fine structure constant", whose tentative conclusion is that, "qualitatively, [the] results suggest a violation of the Einstein Equivalence Principle, and could infer a very large or infinite universe, within which our 'local' Hubble volume represents a tiny fraction."

Explanations
Dutch physicist and string theorist Erik Verlinde has generated a self-contained, logical derivation of the equivalence principle based on the starting assumption of a holographic universe.  Given this situation, gravity would not be a true fundamental force as is currently thought but instead an "emergent property" related to entropy.  Verlinde's entropic gravity theory apparently leads naturally to the correct observed strength of dark energy; previous failures to explain its incredibly small magnitude have been called by such people as cosmologist Michael Turner (who is credited as having coined the term "dark energy") as "the greatest embarrassment in the history of theoretical physics". These ideas are far from settled and still very controversial.

Experiments
University of Washington
Lunar Laser Ranging
Galileo-Galilei satellite experiment
Satellite Test of the Equivalence Principle (STEP)
MICROSCOPE
Satellite Energy Exchange (SEE)
"...Physicists in Germany have used an atomic interferometer to perform the most accurate ever test of the equivalence principle at the level of atoms..."

See also

Classical mechanics
Eötvös experiment
Einstein's thought experiments
Equivalence principle (geometric)
Gauge gravitation theory
General covariance
Mach's principle
Tests of general relativity
Unsolved problems in astronomy
Unsolved problems in physics

Notes

References

 Dicke, Robert H.; "New Research on Old Gravitation", Science 129, 3349 (1959). This paper is the first to make the distinction between the strong and weak equivalence principles.
 Dicke, Robert H.; "Mach's Principle and Equivalence", in Evidence for gravitational theories: proceedings of course 20 of the International School of Physics "Enrico Fermi", ed. C. Møller (Academic Press, New York, 1962). This article outlines the approach to precisely testing general relativity advocated by Dicke and pursued from 1959 onwards.
 Einstein, Albert; "Über das Relativitätsprinzip und die aus demselben gezogene Folgerungen", Jahrbuch der Radioaktivitaet und Elektronik 4 (1907); translated "On the relativity principle and the conclusions drawn from it", in The collected papers of Albert Einstein. Vol. 2 : The Swiss years: writings, 1900–1909 (Princeton University Press, Princeton, New Jersey, 1989), Anna Beck translator. This is Einstein's first statement of the equivalence principle.
 Einstein, Albert; "Über den Einfluß der Schwerkraft auf die Ausbreitung des Lichtes", Annalen der Physik 35 (1911); translated "On the Influence of Gravitation on the Propagation of Light" in The collected papers of Albert Einstein. Vol. 3 : The Swiss years: writings, 1909–1911 (Princeton University Press, Princeton, New Jersey, 1994), Anna Beck translator, and in The Principle of Relativity, (Dover, 1924), pp 99–108, W. Perrett and G. B. Jeffery translators, . The two Einstein papers are discussed online at The Genesis of General Relativity.
 Brans, Carl H.; "The roots of scalar-tensor theory: an approximate history", . Discusses the history of attempts to construct gravity theories with a scalar field and the relation to the equivalence principle and Mach's principle.
 Misner, Charles W.; Thorne, Kip S.; and Wheeler, John A.; Gravitation, New York: W. H. Freeman and Company, 1973, Chapter 16 discusses the equivalence principle.
 Ohanian, Hans; and Ruffini, Remo; Gravitation and Spacetime 2nd edition, New York: Norton, 1994,  Chapter 1 discusses the equivalence principle, but incorrectly, according to modern usage, states that the strong equivalence principle is wrong.
 Uzan, Jean-Philippe; "The fundamental constants and their variation: Observational status and theoretical motivations", Reviews of Modern Physics 75, 403 (2003).  This technical article reviews the best constraints on the variation of the fundamental constants.
 Will, Clifford M.; Theory and experiment in gravitational physics, Cambridge, UK: Cambridge University Press, 1993. This is the standard technical reference for tests of general relativity.
 Will, Clifford M.; Was Einstein Right?: Putting General Relativity to the Test, Basic Books (1993). This is a popular account of tests of general relativity.
 Will, Clifford M.; The Confrontation between General Relativity and Experiment, Living Reviews in Relativity (2006). An online, technical review, covering much of the material in Theory and experiment in gravitational physics. The Einstein and strong variants of the equivalence principles are discussed in sections 2.1  and 3.1, respectively.
 Friedman, Michael; Foundations of Space-Time Theories, Princeton, New Jersey: Princeton University Press, 1983. Chapter V discusses the equivalence principle.

External links

 Equivalence Principle at NASA, including tests
 Introducing The Einstein Principle of Equivalence from Syracuse University
 The Equivalence Principle at MathPages
 The Einstein Equivalence Principle at Living Reviews on General Relativity

General relativity
Fictitious forces
Albert Einstein
Principles
Acceleration
Philosophy of astronomy
Articles containing video clips